Payam Air is a cargo airline based in Tehran, Iran. It operates cargo services for the Iranian postal, telecom and commercial services. Its main base is Mehrabad International Airport, Tehran.

History 

The airline was established in 1996 and is owned by Iran Telecommunications Company (50%) and Islamic Republic of Iran Post Company (50%). It has 245 employees (at March 2007). At present 100% of the Payam is owned by the Islamic Republic of Iran Post company and is completely state owned.

Fleet 

The Payam Air fleet consists of the following aircraft (as of August 2021):

Previously operated
At January 2005 the airline also operated:
2 Ilyushin Il-76TD

See also
 List of airlines of Iran

References

External links
Payam Air

Airlines of Iran
Airlines established in 1996
Cargo airlines
Iranian companies established in 1996